The Chicago Sketch Comedy Festival (or SketchFest) is an annual nonprofit sketch comedy festival held in Chicago's Lakeview neighborhood at Stage 773 (1225 W Belmont Ave).  This is the world's largest sketch festival, featuring 160 sketch groups (totaling over 1,000 performers) in roughly 180 shows throughout the festival's two-weekend run. This year, SketchFest organizers are projecting an audience of over 11,000 patrons. Past SketchFest sponsors include Burt's Bees, Uber, Red Bull, Chipotle and Whole Foods, though many local businesses team up with Stage 773 in order to make SketchFest happen.

The fourteenth installment will take place January 8–18, 2014.

The idea for SketchFest was born in October 2001, when Chicago teacher/director Brian Posen wanted to create a venue to showcase the city's best sketch comedy troupes and provide a venue for up-and-coming troupes, all free from financial burden. A theater was leased and sketch groups from around Chicago were invited to perform at no cost. The festival opened in January 2002, and ran for 7 weeks. Over 30 sketch comedy groups performed, nearly 2000 patrons attended.

Building on the success of the first festival, the Chicago Sketch Comedy Festival became an annual event.

In order to be considered for the festival, interested sketch groups are required to submit an application including videos of their material as well as critical reviews of their performances. Groups must also submit a resume detailing which festivals they've participated in and where they've performed. These applications are collected in mid-October, and within one month, a panel of judges reviews these applications and announces a final lineup

Sketchfest 2003 hosted 53 groups, this time from all over the nation. The festival was shortened to 3½ weeks. A panel of sketch comedy experts was added to share their knowledge with performers and the public, and weekly forums were put together so that groups from all over the country could come together and share information.

The Chicago Sketch Comedy Festival in 2004 expanded to three theaters and 120 performances. It ran two weeks, and attracted close to 5500 patrons. 71 groups performed that year. Besides the panels and forums, 2 new events were added: Sketchubator & Octasketch-The 8 Hour Project. Sketchubator ran Saturday nights at midnight, and provided a free-for-all for sketch groups to perform experimental work. Octasketch was an experiment modeled after "The 24 hours project". Four seasoned directors were randomly assigned Five writer-performers, all from different sketch groups, and given 8 hours to create a 30-minute sketch show performed that night. The festival also gained the sponsorship of Budweiser, WBEZ, Days Inn, Kinkos, & National Photo.

The Chicago Sketchfest 2005 had 83 groups over the 2 weeks. In addition to the events, writing workshops were added, including Joe Garden- head writer from the Onion, and John Vorhaus-author of "The Comic Toolbox". Budweiser was back. Red Bull joined the sponsors. New sponsors included WXRT, The Onion, and Whole Foods, American Airlines and Avis. In 2005, the Chicago Sketchfest officially changed its name to "The Chicago Sketch Comedy Festival". Some patrons had actually called the box office to see if it was a festival about drawing. We needed the word 'Comedy'.

January 2006 marked the 5-year anniversary with 92 sketch comedy groups performing. Over 700 artists came together to perform, collaborate, share information. An event called Master Sketch was added, in which participating groups performed a scene in front of some of the masters in the industry and received feedback from these masters. This is the first year that Chipotle signed on as a sponsor.

2007- The festival was one shy of 100 groups (approximately 800 performers) and hit 10,000 patrons. OctaSketch entered its 4th year, and honored four  the major comedy institutions The Second City, iO, Annoyance and ComedySportz by having each of them supply a director who created under their specific style. Sam Adams came on board as a sponsor.

In 2008, the 7th year, 100 groups signed on. Lou Malnatis' Pizza was the new sponsor.

In 2009, the festival added Children's programming. Sketch by kids, Sketch for kids and sketches educating kids.

In 2010, the children's programming was expanded.

The 2011 festival marks the 10 year anniversary of The Chicago Sketch Comedy Festival.

External links 
 Official Site for the Chicago Sketch Comedy Festival 

Comedy festivals in the United States
Festivals in Chicago
Sketch comedy festivals